Chalan Pago-Ordot is a village in the United States territory of Guam, containing the communities of Chalan Pago and Ordot.  It is located in the eastern-central part of the island and is part of the Kattan (Eastern) District. The village's population has increased slightly since the island's 2010 census.

Etymology 
Pågu is the Chamorro word for the wild tree Hibiscus tiliaceus, while "chålan"' means "road".  The name Chalan Pago is named after the path from Hagåtña to the Spanish village at Pago Bay. Ordot comes from the word otdot, or ant.

In World War II, the Japanese used the area as a supply depot during their occupation of the island.  Ordot is also the site of the controversial Ordot Landfill, first constructed by the U.S. Navy in the 1940s, but now full and in violation of United States Environmental Protection Agency (EPA) regulations. It was added to the National Priorities List in 1983 by the EPA, with the Navy as a potential contributor to it. The landfill was forced closed in 2011 and Guam agreed to pay for remediation of the surrounding area atop implemented a cap on the landfill from a prior 2004 consent decree. Guam had been able to successfully initiate action to recover a portion of the estimated  costs for this cleanup from the US government as a result of the Supreme Court case Guam v. United States in 2021.

Demographics
The U.S. Census Bureau has the municipality in multiple census-designated places: Chalan Pago, and Ordot.

Education 

The Guam Public School System serves the island.

Ordot/Chalan Pago Elementary School and Agueda Johnston Middle School are located in Chalan-Pago-Ordot. Johnston is located in Ordot; originally it was named George Washington Junior High School. George Washington High School in Mangilao serves the village as a secondary school.

Father Dueñas Memorial School is in the area.

St. Thomas Aquinas Catholic High School was open 2008–2015.

Government

See also 
Villages of Guam

References

External links

Ordot map from PDN
Rogers, Robert F (1995). Destiny's Landfall: A History of Guam: University of Hawai'i Press. 

Villages in Guam